Aster Mamo is an Ethiopian diplomat who is the ambassador of Ethiopia to Canada since January 2018.

Before, she served as the chief government whip of the Ethiopian Government from 2014–2015 and as a member of the Central Committee of the Oromo Peoples' Democratic Organization (OPDO) until 2016. She has also served as Ethiopia's Youth and Sports Minister from 2005–2014.

On 8 April 2014 she was appointed 2nd Deputy Prime Minister and Minister for the Civil Service, succeeding Muktar Kedir in that role. In October 2016, both her posts as 2nd Deputy Prime Minister and minister for Civil Service were abolished and she left her positions after having resigned as Central Committee member of the OPDO.

She is currently ambassador to Canada since January 2018.

References

Year of birth missing (living people)
Living people
21st-century Ethiopian politicians
Ambassadors of Ethiopia to Canada
Deputy Prime Ministers of Ethiopia
Ethiopian diplomats
Ethiopian women diplomats
Government ministers of Ethiopia
Oromo Democratic Party politicians
Women government ministers of Ethiopia
21st-century Ethiopian women politicians
Ethiopian women ambassadors